Mal, Verve, Black & Blue is a live album by jazz pianist Mal Waldron recorded in 1994 and released on the German Tutu label.

Track listing
All compositions by Mal Waldron except as indicated
 "Judy Full Grown" — 12:28 
 "Transylvanian Dance" — 16:57 
 "Here Comes Mikey" — 11:39 
 "Soul Eyes" — 10:50 
 "I See You Now" — 13:50 
 "The Last Go Pepper Blues" — 9:06 
 "No Title" — 0:17
Recorded at the Theatre Satiricon in Essen, Germany on October 11, 1994

Personnel 
 Mal Waldron — piano
 Nicolas Simion — tenor saxophone
 Ed Schuller — bass 
 Victor Jones — drums

References 

1996 live albums
Mal Waldron albums